Newport News High School was a high school located in Newport News, Virginia, United States. It was located at 3100 Huntington Avenue and operated by Newport News Public Schools.

History
In 1896, the first segregated white high school in Newport News was in the First National Bank building at Washington Ave. & 28th Street. Its first principal was Horace H. Epes. It later held classes at Central School from 1899 until Central School burned down in 1913. Classes then met at John W. Daniel School which was constructed in 1908. Both Central and Daniel Schools were in the 3100 block of Lafayette (later Huntington) Ave. Walter Reed School at 2410 Wickham Ave. served as a high school until Newport News High School was built in 1924. Daniel served as a public school until 1960, when it became the first home of Christopher Newport University.

Newport News boasted one of the finest athletic fields in Virginia with the opening in 1935 of a concrete stadium, Saunders Stadium, with classrooms below at Newport News High School. A new gymnasium, named for the long-time athletic director and coach Julius "Julie" Conn, was opened in 1964.

In 1971, Newport News High School was converted, along with George Washington Carver and Collis P. Huntington High Schools, to an intermediate school after the city's school district freedom-of-choice plan was struck down in the federal court and school districting went into effect.

In 1980, Newport News Intermediate School was closed.

The school building is now used by the U.S. Navy as an enlisted barracks for ships undergoing maintenance at Newport News Shipbuilding and is named Huntington Hall.

Notable alumni and faculty
Willie Armstead
Thomas Granville Pullen Jr. former principal (1926) President University of Baltimore. 
Herbert H. Bateman
Susan Sandler, author/screenwriter Crossing Delancey 
Eric Burden, the first black student to attend the all-white Newport News High School in 1963.
Lefty Driesell, basketball coach.
John Montague, former Major League Baseball pitcher
Thomas N. Downing, politician.
David Ellenson, rabbi.
Joe S. Frank, politician
Ava Gardner, actor
Jimmye Laycock, 1970, offensive coach, Newport News High School and former head football coach, College of William and Mary.
Charles Nuttycombe
Parke S. Rouse, Jr., 1933 graduate, newspaper columnist and author of several regional history books.
John B. Todd
 Coney A. Turbeville, Jr. (1955) Successful business and real estate entrepreneur
Nathaniel Jarrett Webb (1891–1943) 1919–1921, football coach, math and science teacher (later member of Virginia House of Delegates, 1936–1939).

Athletics
Virginia high school athletic records are kept by the Virginia High School League

Baseball
 State IA baseball championship runner-up 1953 G. Washington-Danville. 1, Newport News 0
 State IA baseball championship 1920

Basketball
State IA basketball championship 1964 Newport News 66, Hampton 54
State I basketball championship 1958 Newport News 50, Granby 48
State I basketball championship 1957 Newport News 53, Virginia-Bristol 31
State I basketball championship 1956 Newport News 63, Geo. Washington-Alex. 52
State I basketball championship 1952 Newport News 55, Washington-Lee 37
State I basketball championship 1951 Newport News 44, Woodrow Wilson 42
State I basketball championship runner-up 1950 Granby 57, Newport News 34
State I basketball championship runner-up 1948 John Marshall 45, Newport News 35
State I basketball championship runner-up 1944 Thom. Jefferson-Rich 32, Newport News 27
State I basketball championship runner-up 1943 Newport News 33, Thom. Jefferson-Rich. 26
State I basketball championship 1942 Newport News 31, John Marshall 24
State I basketball championship 1938 Newport News 25, Thom. Jefferson-Rich. 23
State I basketball championship runner-up 1934 Jefferson Sr.-Roanoke 23, Newport News 22
State I basketball championship runner-up 1933 George Washington 24, Newport News 17
State I basketball championship 1931 Newport News 29, Geo. Washington-Dan. 19

Football
 State AAA football championship 1931
 State AAA football championship 1929 - Maury, Norfolk, Newport News (tie)
 State AAA football championship 1925 - Newport News 7, Lynchburg 6
 State AAA football championship 1920 - Newport News 14 /  Jefferson Senior, Roanoke 7.  Newport News' coach in the 1920 season was Nathaniel Jarrett Webb, Sr. (April 25, 1891 - July 18, 1943).

Virginia State Track and Field Championships
Newport News High School won 21 State Outdoor Track and Field Championships.
 Note:  Ronald Ray still holds the legacy national record for 440 yards, set in 1973

References

Defunct schools in Virginia
Educational institutions established in 1924
Educational institutions disestablished in 1980
High schools in Newport News, Virginia
1924 establishments in Virginia